The 2012 Goldwater Women's Tennis Classic was a professional tennis tournament played on outdoor hard courts. It was the fourth edition of the tournament which was part of the 2012 ITF Women's Circuit. It took place in Phoenix, Arizona, on November 5–11, 2012.

WTA entrants

Seeds 

 1 Rankings are as of October 29, 2012.

Other entrants 
The following players received wildcards into the singles main draw:
  Victoria Duval
  Jainy Scheepens
  Taylor Townsend
  Ashley Weinhold

The following players received entry from the qualifying draw:
  Jan Abaza
  Kristie Ahn
  Gabriela Dabrowski
  Sachia Vickery

The following player received entry as a Lucky Loser:
  Romana Tedjakusuma

Champions

Singles 

  Madison Keys def.  Maria Sanchez, 6–3, 7–6(7–1).

Doubles 

  Jacqueline Cako /  Natalie Pluskota def.  Eugenie Bouchard /  Ulrikke Eikeri, 6–3, 2–6, [10–4]

External links 
 2012 John Newcombe Women's Pro Challenge at ITFTennis.com
 

Goldwater Women's Tennis Classic
Hard court tennis tournaments in the United States
Tennis tournaments in Arizona
2012 in sports in Arizona
2012 in American tennis